Piaf is the title of an album released by Elaine Paige in 1994.

It consists of a number of covers of songs originally recorded by Édith Piaf and was released to coincide with Paige's appearance in Pam Gems' biographical play Piaf in London.

The album was recorded at Master Rock, Olympic, Maison Rouge, Imagination and Lansdowne Studios. It was mixed at Master Rock.

It was released by Warner Music UK on the WEA label. It peaked at #46 on the UK Albums Chart and stayed on the chart for six weeks.

Track list 
 "Hymne à l'amour (If You Love Me)" – 2:52 (Marguerite Monnot/Edith Piaf/Geoffrey Parsons)
 "C'est à Hambourg (Harbour Girl)" – 4:00 (Charles Dumont/Edith Piaf/Pam Gems/Adrian Mitchell)
 "La Vie en rose" – 2:40 (Louiguy/Edith Piaf)
 "La Goualante du pauvre Jean (The Ballad of Poor Old John)" – 1:44 (Marguerite Monnot/Rene Rouzard/Adrian Mitchell)
 "Les Trois Cloches (The Three Bells)" – 3:53 (Jean Villard Gilles/Bert Reisfeld)
 "Mon Dieu" – 3:46 (Charles Dumont/Michel Vaucaire)
 "Les Amants d'un Jour (Lovers for a Day)" – 3:17 (Marguerite Monnot/Jacques Delecluse/Michelle Senlis/Pam Gems/Adrian Mitchell)
 "La Belle Histoire d'amour" – 4:18 (Charles Dumont/Edith Piaf/Adrian Mitchell)
 "Je sais comment (All This I Know)" – 3:29 (Julien Bouquet/Robert Chauvigny/Norman Newell/Hal Shaper)
 "Non, je ne regrette rien" – 3:42 (Charles Dumont/Edith Piaf)
 "L'Accordeoniste (The Accordionist)" – 4:03 (E. Emer/Adrian Mitchell)

Production credits

Musicians

Other credits

Certifications and sales

References

Elaine Paige albums
1994 albums